In molecular biology, the auxin binding protein family is a family of proteins which bind auxin. They are located in the lumen of the endoplasmic reticulum (ER). The primary structure of these proteins contains an N-terminal hydrophobic leader sequence of 30-40 amino acids, which could represent a signal for translocation of the protein to the ER. The mature protein comprises around 165 residues, and contains a number of potential N-glycosylation sites. In vitro transport studies have demonstrated co-translational glycosylation. Retention within the lumen of the ER correlates with an additional signal located at the C terminus, represented by the sequence Lys-Asp-Glu-Leu, known to be responsible for preventing secretion of proteins from the lumen of the ER in eukaryotic cells.

References

Plant proteins